West Exe School is a coeducational secondary school located in Exeter, with a catchment area covering St Thomas, Alphington, and some parts of Exwick. Known in the local community as a source of controversy, the school has featured in the local press numerous times, and made national headlines in 2012 and 2016 for negative reasons.

History 
The origins of the school date back to the Victorian times, when the mergers of a number of smaller schools resulted in the creation in 1889 of two National Schools: one for boys at the end of Cowick Street, and another for infants and girls adjacent to Emmanuel Church on Okehampton Road. In 1900, when St Thomas became part of the city of Exeter, control of these schools moved to the Exeter School Board. The Board moved the boys' school to the bottom of Dunsford Road, and in 1917 the girls' school was destroyed by fire.

In 1921, the Dunsford Road Boys' School was renamed to the John Stocker School, after John Stocker, the recently retired chairman of the Education Board. In 1930 the boys' school was split into John Stocker Senior Boys' School and John Stocker Junior Boys' School, both of which still used the Dunsford Road site. The site on Cowick Street used by the boys' school until 1900 was taken over by a number of girls' and infants' schools that had previously been based in different locations around St Thomas, Redhills and Exwick.

The schools were all merged into a single Boys' Secondary Modern School and Girls' Secondary Modern School in 1967, and in 1972 the two were merged into a single comprehensive school. In 1973 the two halves of the newly united school started using a new site on Cowick Lane, being renamed to Exeter St Thomas High School under the headship of Bill Ridley, who was in post from 1973 until 1997. Under new headteacher Steve Maddern the school was renamed to West Exe Technology College and a new school logo designed in 1998 to reflect its status as a specialist Technology College under the Government's Specialist Colleges programme. In 2005, a new school building was completed on the playing fields of the St Thomas High School and a new rugby field was built on top of the old building. 

Following the end of the Government's Specialist Colleges programme, the school was renamed to West Exe School in 2014, and a new logo was adopted. On 28 February 2018, it became an academy and joined the Ted Wragg Multi-Academy Trust.

Controversy 
West Exe School has received significant negative media coverage.

In 2012, a Devon County Council report described the "unhealthy culture" and "weak governance" at West Exe. This report was mentioned in both the local newspaper and on the BBC's news website. The headteacher Steve Maddern resigned in the same year after it emerged that he was being paid £152,000 per year and a local education authority audit report said there had been "insufficient professional distance" between him and chair of governors Paul Smith.

Between 2014 and 2016, there were five different headteachers at the school, all of whom changed the behaviour and uniform policies. In 2015, 1500 students and parents signed a petition against the school's uniform policies, and a parent reported that their son was excluded from the school for being "too blonde" after the school claimed his hair had been dyed. The petition received coverage in both the local and national press, but the school's uniform policy did not change until the headteacher left the school later in the year for unrelated reasons.

In June 2016, West Exe School made the headlines twice, first when a GCSE Computer Science exam was cancelled as a result of cheating on the part of a teacher. Secondly, a mother was taken to Exeter Magistrates Court after she removed her child from the school as a result of the poor anti-bullying policy, explaining to the court that she feared for her child's safety in the school.

In November 2016, the school was described by the local newspaper as "in the spotlight again" after a staff member reported that children were "running riot", referring to an incident in the school's canteen described by students as a "food fight". This happened in the absence of the headteacher; although the governors described the headteacher as on leave for "personal reasons", it was later revealed that he had in fact resigned without notice.

References

External links 
West Exe School - West Exe School Home Page.

Secondary schools in Devon
Schools in Exeter
Academies in Devon
Educational institutions established in 1973